The National Federation for Constitutional Liberties (NFCL) (1940–c. 1946) was a civil rights advocacy group made up from a broad range of people (including many trade unionists, religious organizations, African-American civil rights advocates and professional organizations).

History

Formation
The NFCL founded at a national conference on civil liberties held in Washington, D.C. in June 1940.

Purpose
The purpose of the Federation was co-ordinate the activities of the various groups involved within the organization to gain greater democratic freedoms for all who were involved. As well as civil rights advocacy, the Federation was also against lynching, poll tax, and discrimination, the Jim Crow laws, and ran campaigns against these occurrences.

In a proposed Anti-Fascist Civil Rights Declaration for 1944, the Federation called for a permanent Fair Employment Practice Committee (FEPC), equality within the US armed forces, legislation against antisemitism and all forms of incitement to racial hatred, a ban on discrimination in employment and in housing, the abolition of Jim Crow, and passage of a federal anti-lynching bill.

The Federation publicized its campaigns and other activities through numerous pamphlets and through Action Letters mailed to thousands of local leaders, unions, churches, civic and professional groups. It organized conferences, public meetings and banquets with outstanding speakers and civil liberties advocates. Its Academic Council led the defense of educators like Max Yergan, blacklisted by the United States for their political beliefs.

Controversy
The Federation was considered "subversive" and "Communist" by Attorney General Tom C. Clark, and the group was considered one of eleven "subversive organizations", drawn up on 3 April 1947 at the request of Clark.

Attorney General Francis Biddle claimed this was as "part of what Lenin called the 'solar system' of organizations, ostensibly having no connection with the Communist Party, by which Communists attempt to create sympathizers and supporters of their program".

George Marshall, who served as chairman of the National Federation for Constitutional Liberties and the Civil Rights Congress, worked with Paul Robeson, Dashiell Hammett, and William L. Patterson on litigation protecting the rights of African-Americans and American communists. Marshall was called before the House Committee on Un-American Activities, where he was cited for Contempt of Congress for refusing to turn over records from the National Federation. Convicted, he served three months in a federal prison in 1950.

Merger
By 1946–1947, the NFCL rolled into the Civil Rights Congress (along with the International Labor Defense (ILD) and the National Negro Congress.

See also
 Communist front
 Civil Rights Congress
 International Labor Defense
 National Negro Congress

References

Civil rights organizations in the United States
Cold War
Organizations established in 1940
1940 establishments in the United States